Idiodiaptomus gracilipes is a species of copepod in the family Diaptomidae. It is endemic to "a pool at Itapura", in São Paulo state, Brazil.

References

Diaptomidae
Fauna of Brazil
Freshwater crustaceans of South America
Monotypic arthropod genera
Endemic fauna of Brazil
Taxonomy articles created by Polbot